Kevin Lewis Williams (January 7, 1958 – February 1, 1996) was an American football wide receiver in the National Football League who played for the Baltimore Colts. He played college football for the USC Trojans. Williams also had a career in the USFL for the Denver Gold, Los Angeles Express, and San Antonio Gunslingers	

Williams died in a train crash on February 1, 1996.

References

1958 births
1996 deaths
20th-century American people
American football wide receivers
Baltimore Colts players
Denver Gold players
Los Angeles Express players
San Antonio Gunslingers players
USC Trojans football players
Railway accident deaths in the United States